Jessica de la Cruz (born July 20, 1981) is an American politician serving as a member of the Rhode Island Senate from the 23rd district, which includes the communities of Burrillville, Pascoag, Mapleville, and Chepachet. Elected in November 2018, she assumed office on January 1, 2019.

Early life
de la Cruz was born on July 20, 1981, in Rhode Island to Portuguese immigrant parents.

Career
On November 6, 2018, de la Cruz was elected to the Rhode Island Senate, where she has been representing the 23rd district since January 1, 2019. She is a Republican.

Personal life
de la Cruz resides in Forestdale, Rhode Island. She and her husband, David, have three children.

References

1981 births
21st-century American politicians
21st-century American women politicians
American people of Portuguese descent
Living people
People from North Smithfield, Rhode Island
Republican Party Rhode Island state senators
Women state legislators in Rhode Island